Mohamed El-Ashram (24 July 1955 – 23 March 2022) was an Egyptian wrestler. He competed in two events at the 1984 Summer Olympics.

References

External links
 

1955 births
2022 deaths
Egyptian male sport wrestlers
Olympic wrestlers of Egypt
Wrestlers at the 1984 Summer Olympics
Place of birth missing
20th-century Egyptian people